Ľudovít Lehen (3 June 1925 – 12 May 2014) was a painter and a FIDE Master for chess compositions.

Biography
Lehen studied at the University of Arts, Bratislava between 1949 and 1955 under the professors D. Milly, V. Hložník.
In 1956 Lehen won first place in the Czechoslovak national competition for realist productions and a year later won second place in a graphics art competition, . Near the conclusion of the 1950s his works toured Belgium, China and the Soviet Union. Ultimately, he was charged in a show trial typical of communist Czechoslovakia, and from 1962 he spent 6 years behind bars at Leopoldov Prison. During the reforms of the Prague Spring of 1968 he was found innocent and released, and after his release Lehen started painting and become very solitary. Some of his works are now on permanent display at the Slovak National Gallery in Bratislava.

He composed chess problems since 1977. He has gained distinctions including the first prizes in many chess composition tourneys, often in coauthorship with IM Juraj Brabec. This composing duo pioneered many complex themes in fairy twomovers, working usually in a way Brabec proposing the scheme and Lehen developing it in the artistically satisfactory manner. In 2005 he became a FIDE master of chess compositions.

Exhibitions in Slovakia
1967 – Leopoldov
1968 – Leopoldov
1973 – Trenčín – Art Protisy
1985 – Šaľa – Pastels
1998 – Galanta – Selection
2001 – ACTS - Bratislava
2003 – Bratislava Parliament

Studio 

Lehen lived in Petržalka in Bratislava.  His flat was his studio and sometimes served as an exhibition room.  His art centred on the female figure, sometimes as a daughter and sometimes as Venus or a girl in traditional clothing. The figures are stylized and included influences from non-European art.

References

Chronicle Trencin
Chronicle Leopoldov
Bills to exhibitions
Slovak organization compositional chess (Slovenská organizácia kompozičného šachu) - Juraj Brabec, Juraj Lörinc: Ľudo Lehen.
Ľudovít Lehen bio and selected chess compositions at Chess Composition Microweb

External links

Ľudo Lehen
Flower among Be tone - Marco Gerbi about Ľudo Lehen in 2005 (published also in Italian ARTEIN)
Dušan Valocký: To independent exhibitions Ľudo Lehen - 2001
 With friends of chess composition - April 2008
To 80. birthday Ľudo Lehen
List of selected chess problems by composers
List of chess problems in Slovak newspapers

1925 births
2014 deaths
Chess composers
People from Banská Bystrica
Slovak painters